Patrick Mara is a former elected member of the District of Columbia Board of Education.

Early years
Mara is originally from Rhode Island. He earned a Bachelor of Science in political science and environmental science at Marist College. While at Marist, Mara was student body president Mara later served as President of the Marist College Alumni Executive Board and the Alumni Representative to the Marist College Board of Trustees. He graduated with a Master of Business Administration in entrepreneurship from Babson College.

Political career
Mara was a staffer for Senator John H. Chafee, working on environmental issues.

In 2008, Mara defeated incumbent Carol Schwartz in the Republican primary for an at-large seat on the Council of the District of Columbia. The Washington Blade endorsed Mara, noting his support for same-sex marriage and other stands in support of civil rights. The Washington Post endorsed Mara in the Republican primary and in the General Election. Democrat Kwame R. Brown and independent Michael A. Brown won the general election.

In 2010, Mara won the Ward One seat on the District of Columbia State Board of Education with 53 percent of the vote. The Washington Post endorsed Mara in the election.

In 2011, Mara ran in a special election for the at-large seat on the Council of the District of Columbia. The Washington Post endorsed Mara in the 2011 special election for At-Large D.C. Council. Mara came in second behind Vincent Orange.

Mara was a board member at DC Vote from 2011 to 2013.

Mara was a candidate in the special election for the at-large seat on the Council of the District of Columbia in 2013. He was endorsed by The Washington Post. New Jersey Governor Chris Christie robocalled Republicans in the District for Mara. The D.C. chapter of the Sierra Club and the District of Columbia Chamber of Commerce endorsed Mara in the special election. Democratic Councilmember Anita Bonds won the election; Mara came in third place.

In 2014, Mara decided not to run for reelection to the District of Columbia State Board of Education.

In January 2015, Mara was appointed executive director of the District of Columbia Republican Committee.

Other ventures
Mara owns The Dolan Group LLC, a business consulting firm in Washington, D.C.

Mara has served on the board of directors of One World Education and the Columbia Heights Day Initiative.

Mara is a board member of College & Career Connections and Washington Latin Public Charter School.

Election results

2008

2010

2011

2013

References

Babson College alumni
Living people
Marist College alumni
Members of the District of Columbia Board of Education
People from Rhode Island
Washington, D.C., Republicans
1975 births